David C. Munson Jr. is an American university professor and administrator and the current president of the Rochester Institute of Technology.

Previously, Munson was dean of the University of Michigan College of Engineering from 2006 to 2016.  He also served as a professor of electrical engineering at University of Illinois at Urbana-Champaign and Chair of the Department of Electrical Engineering and Computer Science at University of Michigan.

On July 1, 2017 he became the 10th president of the Rochester Institute of Technology, succeeding William W. Destler.

Munson's research focuses on signal processing issues in imaging systems. He is the co-founder of InstaRecon, which commercializes fast algorithms for image formation in computer tomography. Munson is also a fellow of the Institute of Electrical and Electronics Engineers (IEEE) and past president of the IEEE Signal Processing Society.

Munson received his bachelor's degree in electrical engineering from the University of Delaware in 1975, and his M.S., M.A., and Ph.D. degrees in electrical engineering from Princeton University in 1977, 1977, and 1979, respectively.

References

Living people
People from Iowa
Presidents of Rochester Institute of Technology
Year of birth missing (living people)
University of Michigan faculty
University of Delaware alumni
Princeton University alumni